Susan Holt is a Canadian politician, who has been the leader of the New Brunswick Liberal Association since August 6, 2022.

Holt worked as chief growth officer for Fredericton software companies Plato Testing and PQA, and has served as president of the New Brunswick Business Council. She ran as the Liberal candidate in Fredericton South in the 2018 New Brunswick general election, losing to New Brunswick Green Party leader David Coon.

As Holt is not currently a sitting member of the Legislative Assembly of New Brunswick, Liberal MLA (Member of the Legislative Assembly) Denis Landry offered in August 2022 to resign his seat so that Holt can run in a by-election. In November 2022, Holt announced that she will accept his offer and run in Landry's riding of Bathurst East–Nepisiguit–Saint-Isidore. Landry then confirmed that he is resigning the seat.

References

21st-century Canadian politicians
21st-century Canadian women politicians
New Brunswick Liberal Association leaders
Politicians from Fredericton
Women in New Brunswick politics
Female Canadian political party leaders
Living people
Year of birth missing (living people)